Gordon Dewolfe Barss (1916 – 2010) was a Baptist missionary who served in India during 1939-1980 through the Canadian Baptist Ministries.

Early life and studies
Dewolfe Barss was born in at the CBM Christian Medical Centre, Pithapuram in 1939 and later schooled at the Kodaikanal International School in Tamil Nadu.  For graduate studies in theology, Dewolfe moved to Canada where he took a B.A. in theology from the Acadia University in 1936.  In 1938, Dewolfe was ordained as a Baptist Pastor by the Canadian Baptist Ministries following which he returned to India to serve as a missionary in Andhra Pradesh and Odisha.  After a decade of missionary service in India, Dewolfe Barss upgraded his academics by enrolling in a Bachelor of Divinity programme at the Andover Newton Theological School, Andover during 1949-1951 and again returned to India to resume his ecclesiastical responsibilities with the Canadian Baptist Ministries.

Ecclesiastical career
When the Baptist Theological Seminary, Kakinada was revived in 1975, Dewolfe Barss took up the Principalship of the Seminary and led the administration for two successive academic years following which the Seminary Council of the Baptist Theological Seminary appointed S. E. Krupa Rao in 1977 to take over the Principalship from Dewolfe Barss.  After serving in India until 1980, Barss settled down in Canada.  During 1989–1990, Barss volunteered as a missionary to Kenya.

Honours
In 1992, the Acadia University honoured Dewolfe Barss with a Doctor of Divinity degree by honoris causa.

References

20th-century Canadian Baptist ministers
Baptist writers
Kodaikanal International School alumni
Acadia University alumni
Andover Newton Theological School alumni
Telugu people
Christian clergy from Andhra Pradesh
Indian Christian theologians
Indian Baptists
Canadian Baptist Ministries missionaries in India
Academic staff of the Senate of Serampore College (University)
Convention of Baptist Churches of Northern Circars pastors
People from East Godavari district
1916 births
2010 deaths